This is a list of the constituent towns, villages and areas of Birmingham (both the city and the metropolitan borough) in England.

Between 1889 and 1995, the city boundaries were expanded to include many places which were once towns or villages in their own right, many of which still retain a distinctive character. The most recent of these additions are Sutton Coldfield, a borough in its own right until 1974, and New Frankley, transferred from Bromsgrove in 1995.

 Acocks Green
 Alum Rock
 Ashted
 Aston
 Aston Cross
 Austin Village
 Balsall Heath
 Balti Triangle
 Bartley Green
 Beech Lanes
 Billesley
 Birches Green
 Birchfield
 Birmingham City Centre
 Boldmere
 Bordesley
 Bordesley Green
 Bournbrook
 Bournville
 Brandwood End
 Brindleyplace
 Bromford
 Browns Green
 Buckland End
 California
 Camp Hill
 Castle Vale
 Chad Valley
 Chinese Quarter
 Churchfield
 Cofton Common
 Cotteridge
 Deritend
 Digbeth
 Doe Bank
 Driffold
 Druids Heath
 Duddeston
 Eastside
 Edgbaston
 Erdington
 Falcon Lodge
 Five Ways
 Four Oaks
 Fox Hollies
 Frankley
 Garretts Green
 Gib Heath
 Gilbertstone
 Glebe Farm
 Gospel Oak
 Gosta Green
 Gravelly Hill
 Great Barr
 Greet
 Grimstock Hill
 Gun Quarter
 Hall Green
 Hamstead
 Handsworth
 Handsworth Wood
 Harborne
 Harts Green
 Hawkesley
 Hay Mills
 High Heath
 Highgate
 Highter's Heath
 Hill Hook
 Hill Wood
 Hockley
 Hodge Hill
 Jewellery Quarter
 Kents Moat
 Kings Heath
 Kings Norton
 Kingstanding
 Kitts Green
 Ladywood
 Lea Hall
 Lee Bank
 The Leverretts
 Ley Hill
 Lifford
 Little Bromwich
 Lodge Hill
 Longbridge
 Lozells
 Lyndon Green
 Maney
 Maypole
 Minworth
 Mere Green
 Moor Green
 Moseley
 Nechells
 New Frankley
 New Oscott
 Newton, Great Barr
 Newtown
 New Town Row
 Northfield
 Old Oscott
 Over Green
 Parkhall
 Pelham
 Perry Barr
 Perry Beeches
 Perry Common
 Pheasey
 Pype Hayes
 Queslett
 Quinton
 Reddicap Heath
 Rednal
 Ridgacre
 Rotton Park
 Roughley
 Rubery (Mostly in Worcestershire)
 Saltley
 Sarehole
 Selly Oak
 Selly Park
 Shard End
 Sheldon
 Shenley Fields
 Shenley Green
 Short Heath
 Showell Green
 Small Heath
 Smithfield
 Soho
 Southside
 South Yardley
 South Woodgate
 Sparkbrook
 Sparkhill
 Springfield
 Spring Vale
 Stechford
 Stirchley
 Stockfield
 Stockland Green
 Streetly
 Sutton Coldfield
 Ten Acres
 The Parade
 Theatreland
 Thimble End
 Tile Cross
 Tower Hill
 Tudor Hill
 Turves Green
 Tyburn
 Tyseley
 Vauxhall
 Wake Green
 Walker's Heath
 Walmley
 Walmley Ash
 Ward End
 Warstock
 Washwood Heath
 Wells Green
 Weoley Hill
 Weoley Castle
 West Heath
 Westside
 Whitehouse Common
 Winson Green
 Witton
 Woodcock Hill
 Woodgate
 Wylde Green
 Yardley
 Yardley Wood

Neighbourhoods
Geography of Birmingham, West Midlands
Birmingham, West Midlands-related lists
Birmingham, Neighbourhoods